The Logan Mills Covered Bridge is a historic wooden covered bridge located at Logan Township in Clinton County, Pennsylvania. It crosses the Fishing Creek. It is the only remaining covered bridge in Clinton County. It is one of the principal attractions in Sugar Valley.

It was listed on the National Register of Historic Places in 1979.

References 

Covered bridges on the National Register of Historic Places in Pennsylvania
Covered bridges in Clinton County, Pennsylvania
Bridges completed in 1874
Wooden bridges in Pennsylvania
Bridges in Clinton County, Pennsylvania
National Register of Historic Places in Clinton County, Pennsylvania
Road bridges on the National Register of Historic Places in Pennsylvania
Queen post truss bridges in the United States